is a Japanese wall-building technique consisting of large number of small stones packed tightly together. It was used in some Japanese castle walls to create a wall that was difficult to climb. As it became more sophisticated it evolved into a technique known as burdock piling.

See also
 Japanese wall
 Dry stone, a similar concept in Western architecture

References

Masonry
Japanese architectural features
Types of wall